The 2008 Pan American Trampoline and Tumbling Championships were held in Buenos Aires, Argentina, December 4–7, 2008.

Medalists

Medal table

References 

2008 in gymnastics
Pan American Gymnastics Championships
 Sports competitions in Buenos Aires
International gymnastics competitions hosted by Argentina
2008 in Argentine sport